Robert Alexis McClure  (March 4, 1897 – January 1, 1957) was an American general, psychological warfare specialist, and is considered the Father of U.S. Army Special Warfare.

Early Life

Robert McClure was born in Mattoon, Illinois the oldest child of George H. McClure and Hattie J. Rudy,  The family would later move to the Madison, Indiana area, in the wake of his parents divorce in 1907. Following his mother's remarriage to Frank Eckert, McClure would grow up on a farm a short distance from the Kentucky border with Indiana in 1911.  McClure attended school in Madison until transferring to the Kentucky Military Institute in Lyndon, Kentucky, graduating in 1915.

World War I

After his graduation, McClure joined the Philippine Constabulary in August 1916 as a 3rd Lieutenant. During his service in the counter insurgency force, McClure would accept a commission as an Infantry 2nd Lieutenant in the Regular Army on August 9th, 1917 with the 31st Infantry Regiment stationed at Fort William McKinley, Philippine Islands. McClure would subsequently serve in Tientisin, Republic of China as part of the 15th Infantry Regiment in 1918. The unit was responsible for securing rail access between the port of Chinwangtao, Tientsin and Tongshau.

Interwar years

In 1920 following the WWI draw-down, Captain McClure would briefly return to the Philippine Islands, stationed in Manila with the 27th Infantry Regiment. With the continuing draw-down and realignment of forces, McClure would receive reassignment 

Upon his return to the United States in 1920, McClure would be assigned to the 19th Infantry Regiment located at Camp Sherman, Ohio where he served as the Post Exchange Officer. Being an Army officer that relished working in an operational context. McClure reportedly despised this assignment.

McClure would receive orders in 1922 to Fort Benning, GA where he would serve as an Infantry instructor assigned to the 29th Infantry Regiment.  McClure's capability as an expert horseman proved an asset to the Infantry School and for a time he was an instructor for horsemanship at Fort Benning, leading the military base in several wins in Georgia horse show competitions. While in this capacity, Captain McClure would achieve some minor fame when photos and a short film of him jumping a table of dining Army officers in a demonstration of his equestrian prowess was disseminated to the public. 

While serving in the 29th, Captain McClure would become the commander of the regimental headquarters company, describing to his hometown newspaper as "the most desirable assignment I have had." 

In between leadership assignments, McClure would graduate from the U.S. Army's Infantry School in 1925 and the Cavalry School's Troop Officers Course in Fort Riley, KS in June of 1926. Major General Robert H. Allen, Chief of Infantry recognized Captain McClure's graduation from the Cavalry School as an infantry officer stating, "it is of real importance to the Infantry, and to the service." 

McClure would graduate the Command and General Staff School at  Fort Leavenworth, KS in 1932, and subsequently teach as a Professor of Military Science and Tactics at Riverside Military Academy in Gainesville, GA. In 1936 Captain McClure was selected to attend the Army War College located in Washington, D.C. Post graduation, Lieutenant Colonel McClure would instruct at the Infantry School and War College in addition to serving as the executive officer under General John Dewitt and General Phillip Peyton at the War College. In July of 1940 he would be assigned to G-1 of the Fourth Army, headquartered at the Presidio of San Francisco, CA.

World War II

When the United States declared war on the Empire of Japan on 8 December 1941, McClure was serving as military attaché to the American Embassy in London. He would later be given the additional duty of military attaché liaison to all of the European governments in exile in 1942. With these additional responsibilities, promotions would come quickly to Lieutenant Colonel McClure, becoming a Brigadier General by March 1942, only nineteen months from his promotion Lieutenant Colonel in August of 1940. 

Later that same year McClure was appointed by Lieutenant General Dwight D. Eisenhower to chief of intelligence for the European theater of operations. In preparation for Operation TORCH, Eisenhower next tapped McClure to head the creation of a new organization, one that would close the door on his twenty seven years of experience in the regular Army to one that was wholly unconventional. U.S. Psychological Warfare capabilities had been mothballed following the closure of WWI. The PSYWAR framework Colonel Heber Blankenhorn and his team built to fight the Central Powers in the Great War, had been nearly forgotten through attrition and atrophy following the post WWI drawdown. The entity, known as the Allied Forces Information and Censorship Section (INC) would be the foundation from which the U.S. psychological warfare capabilities in WWII would build. Writing to his wife Marjory in December of 1942 from "somewhere in Africa," McClure would state the following:

Brigadier General McClure would be given the unenviable task of consolidating several military functions into a cohesive unit: public relations, censorship and psychological warfare; with, in McClure's own words "a slop over into civil affairs" included. The INC would include an amalgamation of military and civilian personnel from the U.S. Office of War Information (OWI); the Office of Strategic Services (OSS); the British Political Warfare Executive (PWE); and the U.S. Army. McClure would describe his new duties to his wife Marjory in a September 1943 letter:

McClure was appointed director of the newly created Psychological Warfare Division of SHAEF in 1944. With the end of the war in Europe he was responsible for the Information Control Division which controlled broadcasting and newspapers in Germany during the early stage of the occupation.

Cold War

After the invasion of Korea in 1950, beginning the Korean War, the Office of the Chief of Psychological Warfare was formed in Washington, D.C., headed by McClure. During his tenure, the Psychological Warfare Center was established at Fort Bragg, North Carolina which centralized the newly formed Psychological Warfare School and 10th Special Forces Group at a single location.

In 1952, McClure was assigned to Iran as chief of three U.S. Military Missions, where he played a role in the 1953 d'état and formed a close relationship with the Shah.

He retired from the Army in 1956 and died of a heart attack soon after at Fort Huachuca, Arizona. 

Major General Robert A. McClure is interred at plot 250, Fairmount Cemetery,  Madison, Indiana.

Decorations

During his 40 years of military service to the United States, Major General McClure received a number of military awards, including some foreign decorations.

Here is his ribbon bar:

References

External links

External links
Generals of World War II

1897 births
1957 deaths
People from Mattoon, Illinois
United States Army generals
United States Army Command and General Staff College alumni
United States Army War College alumni
United States Army personnel of World War I
Recipients of the Distinguished Service Medal (US Army)
Recipients of the Legion of Merit
Officiers of the Légion d'honneur
Recipients of the Croix de Guerre 1939–1945 (France)
Recipients of the Order of the Crown (Italy)
United States Army generals of World War II
Military personnel from Illinois